The 1951 Kent State Golden Flashes football team was an American football team that represented Kent State University in the Mid-American Conference (MAC) during the 1951 college football season. In their sixth season under head coach Trevor J. Rees, the Golden Flashes compiled a 4–3–2 record (2–1 against MAC opponents), finished in third place in the MAC, and outscored all opponents by a combined total of 241 to 162.

The team averaged 292.8 rushing yards per game, which remains one of the highest totals in Kent State football history.

The team's statistical leaders included Jack Mancos with 778 rushing yards, Nick Dellerba with 991 yards of total offense, and Bob Scott with 154 receiving yards. Three Kent State players received first-team honors on the All-Mid-American Conference football team: halfback Jack Mancos, defensive tackle Dick Raidel, and defensive guard Williard Divincenzo.

Schedule

References

Kent State
Kent State Golden Flashes football seasons
Kent State Golden Flashes football